Tekawennake or the Tekawennake News is a discontinued weekly community newspaper, published in Ohsweken, Ontario to serve the region's Six Nations and Mississauga First Nations.  The paper billed itself as Canada's oldest weekly that served First Nations.  The paper started publication in 1967 with only 50 copies printed and folded in 2013.

See also
 Turtle Island News
 Two Row Times

References

External links
 Official site 
 Archived issues at Six Nations Public Library

Weekly newspapers published in Ontario
Publications with year of establishment missing
First Nations newspapers
Mississaugas